Mikheil Kajaia is a Georgian-born Serbian Greco-Roman wrestler.

Career
Representing Georgia, Kajaia participated in the 2013 Summer Universiade and he won the bronze medal in the 96 kg event.  He was part of the Georgian Wrestling Team at the 2015 European Games but lost to Italian Daigoro Timoncini at the 1/8 finals. 

In 2017, Kajaia started to wrestle for Serbia. He entered the 2017 European Wrestling Championships in Novi Sad, Serbia but defeated by the Olympic champion Artur Aleksanyan in the second round.  One year later, he won his first European medal, a silver, in Kaspiysk, Russia. He reached the final at 97 kg but lost to Artur Aleksanyan again with a score of 0-7.  At the 2018 Mediterranean Games in Tarragona, Spain, he lost to the eventual champion, Frenchman Mélonin Noumonvi, in the semifinals but still successfully grabbed a bronze medal. Kajaia later won his first world bronze medal in Budapest, Hungary. In the bronze-medal match, Kajaia faced former world champion and home favourite Balázs Kiss. Kajaia trailed 0-3 after the first period but managed a turnaround by winning on criteria with a four-point arm throw.  In April 2021, he competed in the 97 kg event at the 2021 European Wrestling Championships held in Warsaw, Poland.

He competed in the men's 97 kg event at the 2020 Summer Olympics held in Tokyo, Japan.

In 2022, he competed at the Matteo Pellicone Ranking Series 2022 held in Rome, Italy. He competed in the 97kg event at the 2022 World Wrestling Championships held in Belgrade, Serbia.

References

External links
 

1989 births
Living people
People from Imereti
Serbian people of Georgian descent
Serbian male sport wrestlers
World Wrestling Championships medalists
Universiade medalists in wrestling
Mediterranean Games bronze medalists for Serbia
Mediterranean Games medalists in wrestling
Competitors at the 2018 Mediterranean Games
Universiade medalists for Georgia (country)
Wrestlers at the 2019 European Games
European Games competitors for Serbia
European Wrestling Championships medalists
Medalists at the 2013 Summer Universiade
Naturalized citizens of Serbia
Wrestlers at the 2020 Summer Olympics
Olympic wrestlers of Serbia